Stade Mohamed Ouali is a multi-use stadium in Mohammadia, Mascara, Algeria.  It is currently used mostly for football matches and is the home ground of SA Mohammadia.  The stadium holds 15,000 spectators.

References

External links
 Stadium Information 
 dzfoot club profile

Sports venues in Algeria
Buildings and structures in Mascara Province